Carlos Ibáñez e Ibáñez de Ibero, 1st Marquis of Mulhacén, (14 April 1825 – 28 or 29 January 1891) was a Spanish divisional general and geodesist. He represented Spain at the 1875 Conference of the Metre Convention and was the first president of the International Committee for Weights and Measures. As a forerunner geodesist and president of the International Geodetic Association, he played a leading role in the worldwide dissemination of the metric system. His activities resulted in the distribution of a platinum and iridium prototype of the metre to all States parties to the Metre Convention during the first meeting of the General Conference on Weights and Measures in 1889. These prototypes defined the metre right up until 1960.

He was born in Barcelona. According to Spanish tradition, his surname was a combination of his father's first surname, Martín Ibáñez y de Prado and of his mother's first surname, Carmen Ibáñez de Ibero y González del Río. As his parents' surnames were so similar he was often referred as Ibáñez or Ibáñez de Ibero or as Marquis of Mulhacén. When he died in Nice (France), he was still enrolled in the Engineer Corps of the Spanish Army. As he died around midnight, the date of his death is ambiguous, Spaniards retained 28th, and other Europeans 29 January.

Scientific career

From the Map Commission to the Geographic and Statistical Institute in Spain 

Spain adopted the metric system in 1849. The Government was urged by the Spanish Royal Academy of Sciences to approve the creation of a large-scale map of Spain in 1852. The following year Ibáñez was appointed to undertake this task. As all the scientific and technical equipment for a vast undertaking of this kind had to be created, Ibáñez, in collaboration with his comrade, Captain Frutos Saavedra Meneses, drew up the project of a new apparatus for measuring bases. He recognized that the end standards with which the most perfect devices of the eighteenth century and those of the first half of the nineteenth century were still equipped, that Jean-Charles de Borda or Friedrich Wilhelm Bessel simply joined measuring the intervals by means of screw tabs or glass wedges, would be replaced advantageously for accuracy by the system, designed by Ferdinand Rudolph Hassler for the Coast Survey of the United States, and which consisted of using a single standard with lines marked on the bar and microscopic measurements. Regarding the two methods by which the effect of temperature was taken into account, Ibáñez used both the bimetallic rulers, in platinum and brass, which he first employed for the central base of Spain, and the simple iron ruler with inlaid mercury thermometers which was used in Switzerland.

Ibáñez and Saavedra went to Paris to supervise the production by Jean Brunner of a measuring instrument calibrated against the metre which they had devised and which they later compared with Borda's double-toise N°1 which was the main reference for measuring all geodetic bases in France and whose length was by definition 3.8980732 metres at a specified temperature. The four-metre-long Spanish measuring instrument, which became known as the Spanish Standard (French: Règle espagnole), was replicated in order to be used in Egypt. In 1863, Ibáñez and Ismail Effendi Mustafa compared the Spanish Standard with the Egyptian Standard in Madrid. These comparisons were essential, because of the expansibility of solid materials with raise in temperature. Indeed, one fact had constantly dominated all the fluctuations of ideas on the measurement of geodesic bases: it was the constant concern to accurately assess the temperature of standards in the field; and the determination of this variable, on which depended the length of the instrument of measurement, had always been considered by geodesists as so difficult and so important that one could almost say that the history of measuring instruments is almost identical with that of the precautions taken to avoid temperature errors.

In 1858 Spain's central geodetic base of triangulation was measured in Madridejos (Toledo) with exceptional precision for the time thanks to the Spanish Standard. Ibáñez and his colleagues wrote a monograph which was translated into French by Aimé Laussedat. The experiment, in which the results of two methods were compared, was a landmark in the controversy between French and German geodesists about the length of geodesic triangulation bases, and empirically validated the method of General Johann Jacob Bayer, founder of the International Association of Geodesy.

From 1865 to 1868 Ibáñez added the survey of the Balearic Islands with that of the Iberian Peninsula. For this work, he devised a new instrument, which allowed much faster measurements. In 1869, Ibáñez brought it along to Southampton where Alexander Ross Clarke was making the necessary measurements to compare the Standards of length used in the World. Finally, this second version of the appliance, called the Ibáñez apparatus, was used in Switzerland to measure the geodetic bases of Aarberg, Weinfelden and Bellinzona.

In 1870 Ibáñez founded the Spanish National Geographic Institute which he then directed until 1889. At the time it was the world's biggest geographic institute. It encompassed geodesy, general topography, leveling, cartography, statistics and the general service of weights and measures.

Measurement of the Paris meridian over the Mediterranean Sea 

Jean Brunner displayed the Ibáñez-Brunner apparatus at the Exposition Universelle of 1855. Copies of the Spanish standard were also made for France and Germany. These standards would be used for the most important operations of European geodesy. Indeed, the southward extension of Paris meridian's triangulation by Pierre Méchain (1803–1804), then François Arago and Jean-Baptiste Biot (1806–1809) had not been secured by any baseline measurement in Spain.

Moreover Louis Puissant declared in 1836 to the French Academy of Sciences that Jean Baptiste Joseph Delambre and Pierre Méchain had made errors in the triangulation of the meridian arc, which had been used for determining the length of the metre. This is why Antoine Yvon Villarceau verified the geodetic operations at eight points of the Paris meridian arc from 1861 to 1866. Some of the errors in the operations of Delambre and Méchain were then corrected.

In 1865 the triangulation of Spain was connected with that of Portugal and France. In 1866 at the conference of the Association of Geodesy in Neuchâtel, Ibáñez announced that Spain would collaborate in remeasuring and extending the French meridian arc. From 1870 to 1894, François Perrier, then Jean-Antonin-Léon Bassot proceeded to a new survey. In 1879 Ibáñez and François Perrier completed the junction between the geodetic networks of Spain and Algeria and thus completed the measurement of a meridian arc which extended from Shetland to the Sahara. This connection was a remarkable enterprise where triangles with a maximum length of 270 km were observed from mountain stations (Mulhacén, Tetica, Filahoussen, M'Sabiha) over the Mediterranean Sea.

This meridian arc was named West Europe-Africa Meridian-arc by Alexander Ross Clarke and Friedrich Robert Helmert. It yielded a value for the equatorial radius of the earth a = 6 377 935 metres, the ellipticity being assumed as 1/299.15 according to Bessel ellipsoid. The radius of curvature of this arc is not uniform, being, in the mean, about 600 metres greater in the northern than in the southern part.

According to the calculations made at the central bureau of the International Geodetic Association, the net does not follow the meridian exactly, but deviates both to the west and to the east; actually, the meridian of Greenwich is nearer the mean than that of Paris.

International scientific collaboration in geodesy and calls for an international standard unit of length 
In 1866 Spain, represented by Ibáñez, joined the Central European Arc Measurement (German: Mitteleuropäische Gradmessung) at the Permanent Commission meeting in Neuchâtel. In 1867 at the second General Conference of the Central European Arc Measurement (see International Association of Geodesy) held in Berlin, the question of an international standard unit of length was discussed to combine the measurements made in different countries to determine the size and shape of the Earth. The Conference recommended the adoption of the metre and the creation of an international metre commission, according to a preliminary discussion between Johann Jacob Baeyer, Adolphe Hirsch and Carlos Ibáñez e Ibáñez de Ibero. Ferdinand Rudolph Hassler's use of the metre in coastal survey, which had been an argument for the introduction of the Metric Act of 1866 allowing the use of the metre in the United States, probably also played a role in the choice of the metre as international scientific unit of length and the proposal by the European Arc Measurement (German: Europäische Gradmessung) to “establish a European international bureau for weights and measures”.

The French Academy of Sciences and the Bureau des Longitudes in Paris drew the attention of the French government to this issue. The Academy of St Petersburg and the English Standards Commission were in agreement with the recommendation. In November 1869 the French government issued invitations to join the International Metre Commission. Spain accepted and Ibáñez took part in the Committee of preparatory research from the first meeting of this commission in 1870. He was elected president of the Permanent Committee of the International Metre Commission in 1872. He represented Spain at the 1875 conference of the Metre Convention and at the first General Conference on Weights and Measures in 1889. At the first meeting of the International Committee for Weights and Measures, he was elected Chairman of the Committee, a position he held from 1875 to 1891. He received the Légion d'Honneur in recognition of his efforts to disseminate the metric system among all nations and was awarded the Poncelet Prize for his scientific contribution to metrology.

As Carlos Ibáñez e Ibáñez de Ibero stated, the International prototype metre would form the basis of the new international system of units, but it would no longer have any relation to the dimensions of the Earth that geodesists were trying to determine. It would be no more than the material representation of the unity of the system.

The European Arc Measurement decided the creation of an international geodetic standard at the General Conference held in Paris in 1875. Thus, the Commission resolved to acquire, at common expense, a measuring instrument which was to be used either to measure new bases in countries which did not have their own device or to repeat previous measurements. The comparisons of the new results with those provided by the old national standards would make it possible to obtain their equation. The apparatus would to be calibrated at the International Bureau of Weights and Measures (BIPM), using the prototype metre. The system with a microscope and bimetallic rulers, which had given such brilliant results in Spain, was proposed.The 1875 Conference of the International Association of Geodesy also dealt with the best instrument to be used for the determination of gravity. After an in-depth discussion in which an American scholar, Charles Sanders Peirce, took part, the association decided in favor of the reversion pendulum, which was used in Switzerland, and it was resolved to redo in Berlin, in the station where Friedrich Wilhelm Bessel made his famous measurements, the determination of gravity by means of devices of various kinds employed in different countries, to compare them and thus to have the equation of their scales.

The reversible pendulum built by the Repsold brothers was used in Switzerland in 1865 by Émile Plantamour for the measurement of gravity in six stations of the Swiss geodetic network. Following the example set by this country and under the patronage of the International Geodetic Association, Austria, Bavaria, Prussia, Russia and Saxony undertook gravity determinations on their respective territories. As the figure of the Earth could be inferred from variations of the seconds pendulum length, the United States Coast Survey's direction instructed Charles Sanders Peirce in the spring of 1875 to proceed to Europe for the purpose of making pendulum experiments to chief initial stations for operations of this sort, to bring the determinations of the forces of gravity in America into communication with those of other parts of the world; and also for the purpose of making a careful study of the methods of pursuing these researches in the different countries of Europe.

President of the Permanent Commission of the European Arc Measurement from 1874 to 1886, Ibáñez became the first president of the International Geodetic Association (1887–1891) after the death of Johann Jacob Baeyer. Under Ibáñez's presidency, the International Geodetic Association acquired a global dimension with the accession of the United States, Mexico, Chile, Argentina and Japan.

The progresses of metrology combined with those of gravimetry through improvement of Kater's pendulum led to a new era of geodesy. If precision metrology had needed the help of geodesy, it could not continue to prosper without the help of metrology. It was then necessary to define a single unit to express all the measurements of terrestrial arcs, and all determinations of the force of gravity by the mean of pendulum. Metrology had to create a common unit, adopted and respected by all civilized nations. Moreover, at that time, statisticians knew that scientific observations are marred by two distinct types of errors, constant errors on the one hand, and fortuitous errors, on the other hand. The effects of random errors can be mitigated by the least squares method. Constant or systematic errors on the contrary must be carefully avoided, because they arise from one or more causes which constantly act in the same way, and have the effect of always altering the result of the experiment in the same direction. They therefore deprive of any value the observations that they impinge. It was thus crucial to compare at controlled temperatures with great precision and to the same unit all the standards for measuring geodesic bases, and all the pendulum rods. Only when this series of metrological comparisons would be finished with a probable error of a thousandth of a millimetre would geodesy be able to link the works of the different nations with one another, and then proclaim the result of the measurement of the Globe. In 1901, Friedrich Robert Helmert found, mainly by gravimetry, parameters of the ellipsoid remarkably close to reality. Although marked by the concern to correct vertical deflections, taking into account the contributions of gravimetry, research between 1910 and 1950 remained practically limited to large continental triangulations. The most significant work was that by John Fillmore Hayford, which relied mainly on the North American national network. This ellipsoid was adopted in 1924 by the International Union of Geodesy and Geophysics.

In 1889 the General Conference on Weights and Measures met at Sèvres, the seat of the International Bureau. It performed the first great deed dictated by the motto inscribed in the pediment of the splendid edifice that is the metric system: "A tous les temps, à tous les peuples" (For all times, to all peoples); and this deed consisted in the approval and distribution, among the governments of the states supporting the Metre Convention, of prototype standards of hitherto unknown precision intended to propagate the metric unit throughout the whole world. These prototypes were made of a platinum-iridium alloy which combined all the qualities of hardness, permanence, and resistance to chemical agents which rendered it suitable for making into standards required to last for centuries. Yet their high price excluded them from the ordinary field of science. For metrology the matter of expansibility was fundamental; as a matter of fact the temperature measuring error related to the length measurement in proportion to the expansibility of the standard and the constantly renewed efforts of metrologists to protect their measuring instruments against the interfering influence of temperature revealed clearly the importance they attached to the expansion-induced errors. It was common knowledge, for instance, that effective measurements were possible only inside a building, the rooms of which were well protected against the changes in outside temperature, and the very presence of the observer created an interference against which it was often necessary to take strict precautions. Thus, the Contracting States also received a collection of thermometers which accuracy made it possible to ensure that of length measurements.

The BIPM's thermometry work led to the discovery of special alloys of iron-nickel, in particular invar, for which its director, the Swiss physicist Charles-Édouard Guillaume, was granted the Nobel Prize for physics in 1920. In 1900, the International Committee for Weights and Measures responded to a request from the International Association of geodesy and included in the work program of the International Bureau of Weights and Measures the study of measurements by invar's wires. Edvard Jäderin, a Swedish geodesist, had invented a method of measuring geodetic bases, based on the use of taut wires under a constant effort. However, before the discovery of invar, this process was much less precise than the classic method. Charles-Édouard Guillaume demonstrated the effectiveness of Jäderin's method, improved by the use of invar's threads. He measured a base in the Simplon Tunnel in 1905. The accuracy of the measurements was equal to that of the old methods, while the speed and ease of the measurements were incomparably higher.

Late career, marriages and descent 
In 1889, Ibáñez had a stroke and resigned from the management of the Institute of Geography and Statistics, which he had directed for 19 years. His decision seemed to have been precipitated by the publication of a decree which took away economic control of the Institute and handed it over to the Minister of Public Works. Indeed this resignation took effect during a smear campaign orchestrated by Carlist journalist Antonio de Valbuena. The reappearance of the general's first wife after his death in 1891 further discredited him and led to the annulment of his second marriage.

Carlos Ibáñez e Ibáñez de Ibero was married in 1861 to a Frenchwoman, Jeanne Baboulène Thénié. A daughter was born from this marriage. He remarried in 1878 to a Swiss woman, Cécilia Grandchamp. Carlos Ibáñez de Ibero Grandchamp was born from this second union. After the death of Carlos Ibáñez e Ibáñez de Ibero, his two children and Cécilia Grandchamp settled in Geneva, where the latter was from.

Carlos Ibáñez de Ibero Grandchamp, engineer and doctor of philosophy and letters from the University of Paris founded in 1913 the Institute of Hispanic Studies (current Training and Research Unit of Iberian and Latin American Studies of the Faculty of Letters of Sorbonne University).  Although it has been argued that the title of Marquis of Mulhacén was granted to him as a reward for the founding of the Institute of Hispanic Studies of the University of Paris, the invalidation of his parents' marriage prevented him from officially obtaining this title.

Carlos Ibáñez e Ibáñez de Ibero's eldest daughter, Elena Ibáñez de Ibero, married a Swiss lawyer and politician, Jacques Louis Willemin. The title of Marquis of Mulhacén passed to their son, then to their grandson.

Legacy 

In 1889, the French Minister of Foreign Affairs, Eugène Spuller introduced the first General Conference on Weights and Measures with these words:

Your task, so useful, so beneficial to mankind, has been traversed by many vicissitudes for a hundred years. Like all the great things in this world, it has cost many pains, efforts, sacrifices, not to mention the difficulties, dangers, fatigue, tribulations of all kinds, which endured the two great French astronomers Delambre and Méchain, whose works are the basis of all yours. I am sure to be your interpreter, paying them supreme tribute on this day. Who does not remember with emotion the dangers to which Méchain so generously exposed his life? General Morin, who has been your worthy colleague for so long, wrote a few lines on this subject that you will be proud to hear: "To brave dangers similar to those which Méchain ran with the necessary calm, it is not enough to be devoted to science and to its duties; you must have an empire over your senses which will protect you from this kind of vertigo, in the shelter of which the most intrepid soldiers are not always. Someone who, without flinching, has faced the bullets a hundred times is, on the contrary, surprised by this insurmountable weakness in the presence of the emptiness that space offers him." It is a soldier speaking, Gentlemen; please listen to him again when he adds: "Science therefore also has its heroes who, happier than those of war, leave behind only works useful to humanity and not ruins and vengeful hatred."

Thanks to the determination and skill of Delambre and Méchain, the Enlightenment of science overcame the Tower of Babel of weights and measures. But it was not without difficulty: Méchain made a mistake which would almost cause him to lose his mind. In his book, The Measure of All Things: the seven year odyssey and hidden error that transformed the world, Ken Alder recalls some errors that crept into the measurement of the two French scientists and that Méchain had even noticed an inaccuracy which he had not dared to admit. By measuring the latitude of two stations in Barcelona, Méchain had found that the difference between these latitudes was greater than predicted by direct measurement of distance by triangulation. Indeed, clearance in the central axis of the repeating circle caused wear and consequently the zenith measurements contained significant systematic errors.

Nevertheless, it was an infavourable vertical deflection which gave an innacurate determination of Barcelona's latitude and a metre "too short" compared to a more general definition taken from the average of a large number of arcs. The geoid is not a surface of revolution and none of its meridians is identical to another, in other words, the theoretical definition of the metre was inaccessible and misleading at the time of Delambre and Mechain arc measurement, as the geoid is a ball, which on the whole can be assimilated to an ellipsoid of revolution, but which in detail differs from it so as to prohibit any generalization and any extrapolation from the measurement of a single meridian arc. Moreover, it was necessary to assume an oblateness of the Earth in order to calculate the length of the metre from the meridian arc measured by Delambre and Méchain. In 1901, Friedrich Robert Helmert determined the values of his ellipsoid of reference taking into account gravimetry work of the International Geodetic Association. He found 1/298,3 for the flattening of the Earth. This was remarkably close to reality compared to the value of 1/344 which had been used to compute the length of the metre a century earlier.

Furthermore, until Hayford ellipsoid was calculated, vertical deflections were considered as random errors. The distinction between systematic and random errors is far from being as sharp as one might think at first glance. In reality, there are no or very few random errors. As science progresses, the causes of certain errors are sought out, studied, their laws discovered. These errors pass from the class of random errors into that of systematic errors. The ability of the observer consists in discovering the greatest possible number of systematic errors to be able, once he has become acquainted with their laws, to free his results from them using a method or appropriate corrections. It is the experimental study of a cause of error that has led to most of the great astronomical discoveries (precession, nutation, aberration).

Since the metre was originally defined, each time a new measurement is made, with more accurate instruments, methods or techniques, it is said that the metre is based on some error, from calculations or measurements. When Ibáñez took part to the measurement of the West Europe-Africa Meridian-arc, mathematicians like Legendre and Gauss had developed new methods for processing data, including the "least squares method" which allowed to compare experimental data tainted with measurement errors to a mathematical model. This method minimized the impact of measurement inaccuracies. The Earth measurements thus underscored the importance of the scientific method at a time when statistics were implemented in geodesy. As a leading scientist of his time, Ibáñez was one of the 81 initial members of the International Statistical Institute (ISI) and delegate of Spain to the first ISI session (now called World Statistic Congress) in Rome in 1887.

Among the many reasons why Ibáñez could claim recognition from his country and from science, the geodetic junction of Spain and Algeria has been one of the most remarkable. Therefore the Spanish government chose the name of the peak of Mulhacén to attach forever the memory of this famous scientific achievement to the name of Ibáñez, by conferring on him the title of 1st Marquis of Mulhacén, granted, as it is said in the royal decree, " in recognition of the brilliant services which he rendered during his long career, directing with rare talent the Geographical and Statistical Institute of Spain, and contributing to the prestige of Spain among the other nations of Europe and America ".

Unfortunately, the extension of the Paris meridian arc over the Mediterranean Sea in 1879 would soon be forgotten due to the adoption of Greenwich meridian as prime meridian at the 1883 International Geodetic Conference in Rome which was confirmed the next year at the International Meridian Conference in Washington, and because of Spain's adoption of Greenwich Mean Time by a decree of 27 July 1900, applicable from 1 January 1901.

France adopted the time of the international meridian of Greenwich with the law of 9 March 1911. However, the text of law did not refer to the meridian of Greenwich, but to the "average time of Paris delayed by 9 minutes and 21 seconds". From a technical and scientific point of view, at this time, the development of wireless telegraphy hinted at the possibility of unifying Universal Time. From 1910, the astronomical clocks of the Paris Observatory sent the time to sea daily through the Eiffel Tower within a radius of 5 000 km. Following a report by Gustave Ferrié, the Bureau des Longitudes organized at the Paris Observatory a Conférence internationale de l'heure radiotélégraphique in 1912. The International Time Bureau was created and installed in the premises of the Paris Observatory. Due to World War I, the International Convention was never ratified. In 1919, the existence of the International Time Bureau was formalized under the authority of an International Time Commission, under the aegis of the International Astronomical Union, created by Benjamin Baillaud. The International Time Bureau was dissolved in 1987 and its tasks were divided between the International Bureau of Weights and Measures and the International Earth Rotation and Reference Systems Service (IERS).

Until 1929, the International Time Bureau used exclusively the astronomical determination of Universal Time (or Greewich mean sidereal time) carried out at the Paris Observatory. This realization of Universal Time was called heure demi-définitive and was published until 1966 by the International Time Bureau. In 1936, irregularities in the speed of Earth's rotation due to the unpredictable movement of air and water masses were discovered through the use of quartz clocks. They implied that the Earth's rotation was an imprecise way of determining time. As a result, the definition of the second, first seen as a fraction of the Earth's rotation, evolved and became a fraction of the Earth's orbit. Finally, in 1967, the second was defined by atomic clocks. The resulting time scale is the International Atomic Time (TAI). Currently, it is established from more than 400 atomic clocks distributed in more than 80 national laboratories by the International Bureau of Weights and Measures. The International Earth Rotation and Reference Systems Service also plays a fundamental role in Coordinated Universal Time (UTC) by deciding whether to insert a leap second so that it is kept in line with the rotation of the Earth which is subject to irregular variations. The Coordinated Universal Time is the current international time scale since 1965.

The International System of Units (SI, abbreviated from the French Système international (d'unités)) is the modern form of the metric system. It is the only system of measurement with an official status in nearly every country in the world. It comprises a coherent system of units of measurement starting with seven base units, which are the second (the unit of time with the symbol s), metre (length, m), kilogram (mass, kg), ampere (electric current, A), kelvin (thermodynamic temperature, K), mole (amount of substance, mol), and candela (luminous intensity, cd). Since 2019, the magnitudes of all SI units have been defined by declaring exact numerical values for seven defining constants when expressed in terms of their SI units. These defining constants are the hyperfine transition frequency of caesium ΔνCs, the speed of light in vacuum c, the Planck constant h, the elementary charge e, the Boltzmann constant k, the Avogadro constant NA, and the luminous efficacy Kcd.

See also 

History of the metre
 History of geodesy

References

External links 
 Jaime Nubiola, Carlos Ibáñez e Ibáñez de Ibero (1825–1891). Correspondencia europea de C. S. Peirce: creatividad y cooperación científica. Universidad de Navarra.
  Better formatted mathematics at Wikisource.
 
Miguel Parrilla Nieto, Carlos Ibáñez e Ibáñez de Ibero, Real Academia de la Historia.
Excmo. Sr. D. CARLOS IBÁÑEZ E IBÁÑEZ DE IBERO. Académicos Históricos. Real Academia de Ciecias Exactas, Físicas y Naturales.
Emilio Prieto Esteban, Rosé Ángel Robles Carbonell, El General Ibáñez e Ibáñez de Ibero, Marqués de Mulhacén, e-medida Revista Española de Metrología, June 2013.
Rafael Fraguas, Donde nacen los mapas, Madrid, El País, February 15, 2014.
Albert Pérard, Carlos IBAÑEZ DE IBERO (14 avril 1825 – 29 janvier 1891), (inauguration d'un monument élevé à sa mémoire), Madrid, Institut de France Académie des Sciences – Notices et discours., 1957, 7 p., p. 26–31
Paul Appell, LE CENTENAIRE  DU GÉNÉRAL IBANEZ DE IBERO, Revue internationale de l'enseignement, Juillet-Août 1925, pp. 208–211
Adolf Hirsch, LE GENERAL IBANEZ NOTICE NECROLOGIQUE LUE AU COMITE INTERNATIONAL DES POIDS ET MESURE, LE 12 SEPTEMBRE ET DANS LA CONFERENCE GEODESIQUE DE FLORENCE, LE 8 OCTOBRE 1891, Neuchâtel, IMPRIMERIE ATTINGER FRERES, 1891, in COMITÉ INTERNATIONAL DES POIDS ET MESURES, PROCÈS-VERBAUX DES SÉANCES DE 1891, Paris, GAUTHIER-VILLARS ET FILS, IMPRIMEURS-LIBRAIRES, 1892, 197 p., pp. 3–14 or Don Carlos IBANEZ (1825–1891), 1892, 12 p. 

1825 births
1891 deaths
Members of the French Academy of Sciences
Members of the Royal Academy of Belgium
Members of the Prussian Academy of Sciences
Foreign associates of the National Academy of Sciences
Geodesists
Elected Members of the International Statistical Institute
Fellows of the Royal Statistical Society